Exiguobacterium sibiricum is a bacterium. The DR11 strain of these bacteria has been found to eat polystyrene. It was discovered in India, in wetlands by researchers in Shiv Nadar University. It was discovered alongside Exiguobacterium undrae strain DR14.

See also
 Organisms breaking down plastic

References

Bacillaceae
Organisms breaking down plastic
Bacteria described in 2006